Anolis quaggulus is a species of lizard in the family Dactyloidae. The species is found in Honduras, Nicaragua, and Costa Rica.

References

Anoles
Lizards of Central America
Reptiles of Costa Rica
Reptiles of Honduras
Reptiles of Nicaragua
Reptiles described in 1885
Taxa named by Edward Drinker Cope